Bawden Rocks, also known as Cow and Calf or Man and His Man, are a pair of small islands approximately one mile north of St Agnes Head, off the coast of Cornwall, England, United Kingdom.

The rocks are popular with swimmers, divers, anglers and trawler fishermen, being home to a wide range of marine life. Sea anemones, molluscs and crustaceans of various types cling to the rock walls below the surface of the sea, together with marine animals such as the threatened broad sea fan.

The rocks are also a nesting ground for a number of seabird species, including razorbills, cormorants, guillemots, great black-backed gulls and puffins.

A local legend claims that the rocks were thrown out to sea by a child-eating giant called Bolster, after whom Bolster Day was named.

References

Uninhabited islands of Cornwall